Glossoloma is a genus of Neotropical plants in the family Gesneriaceae. The species in the genus were formerly placed in Alloplectus. They are subshrubs with the leaves clustered at the ends of branches, and tubular flowers.

Species
Species include:
Glossoloma altescandens (Mansf.) J.L.Clark
Glossoloma anomalum J.L.Clark
Glossoloma baguense (L.E.Skog) J.L.Clark
Glossoloma bicolor (Kunth) J.L.Clark
Glossoloma bolivianum (Britton ex Rusby) J.L.Clark
Glossoloma carpishense (J.L.Clark & I.Salinas) J.L.Clark
Glossoloma chrysanthum (Planch. & Linden) J.L.Clark
Glossoloma cucullatum (C.V.Montin) J.L.Clark
Glossoloma grandicalyx (J.L.Clark & L.E.Skog) J.L.Clark
Glossoloma harlequinoides J.L.Clark
Glossoloma herthae (Mansf.) J.L.Clark
Glossoloma ichthyoderma (Hanst.) J.L.Clark
Glossoloma martinianum (J.F.Sm.) J.L.Clark
Glossoloma medusaeum (L.E.Skog) J.L.Clark
Glossoloma oblongicalyx (J.L.Clark & L.E.Skog) J.L.Clark
Glossoloma panamense (C.V.Morton) J.L.Clark
Glossoloma pedunculatum J.L.Clark
Glossoloma penduliflorum (M.Freiberg) J.L.Clark
Glossoloma purpureum (L.P.Kvist & L.E.Skog) J.L.Clark
Glossoloma pycnosuzygium (Donn.Sm.) J.L.Clark
Glossoloma scandens J.L.Clark
Glossoloma schultzei (Mansf.) J.L.Clark
Glossoloma serpens (J.L.Clark & L.E.Skog) J.L.Clark
Glossoloma sprucei (Kuntze) J.L.Clark
Glossoloma subglabrum J.L.Clark
Glossoloma tetragonoides (Mansf.) J.L.Clark
Glossoloma tetragonum Hanst.

References

 
Gesneriaceae genera